Gekko wenxianensis is a species of gecko. It is endemic to the Qin Mountains in Gansu, China. At the time of its species description, it was the 12th recorded Gekko species in China.

Etymology
The specific name wenxianensis refers to its type locality, Wen County, Gansu.

Description
It is characterized by its nasal-rostral contact and moderately sized body. Its body has dorsal tubercles extending from the occiput and temporal regions to the back and tail base, but are lacking on the forelimb and thigh. It counts with 6–8 pre-cloacal pores in a continuous series in males, and a tail generally with two cloacal spurs on each side. Snout–vent length varied between  among the males and females in the type series.

Habitat
No other information on the habitat of this species is included in the species description.

References

wenxianensis
Endemic fauna of Gansu
Reptiles of China
Reptiles described in 2008